TTA Airlink was a joint venture of Mozambican airline TTA Empresa Nacional de Transporte e Trabalho Aéreo and South African airline Airlink. They started providing service between Johannesburg and Maputo in February 2010, using an Avro RJ85 leased from Airlink. There are also plans to offer domestic flights within Mozambique.Also now they have expanded to Tetes Chingozi Airport and also Beira Airport on March 15 and to Nampula

The airline has since gone out of business.

References

Defunct airlines of Mozambique
Airlines established in 2010
Airlines disestablished in 2010